Dhubulia railway station is a railway station under the Sealdah railway division of Eastern Railway system. It is situated in Dhubulia, on the Krishnanagar–Lalgola lines in Nadia district in the Indian state of West Bengal. Few EMU and Lalgola passenger trains pass through Dhubulia railway station.

Electrification
The 128 km long Krishnanagar– stretch, including Dhubulia railway station, was electrified in 2007 for EMU services

References

Sealdah railway division
Railway stations in Nadia district
Kolkata Suburban Railway stations